Semomesia is a genus of metalmark butterflies.

Species
Semomesia alyattes Zikán, 1952
Semomesia capanea  (Cramer, 1779) 
Semomesia croesus  (Fabricius, 1777) 
Semomesia geminus  (Fabricius, 1793) 
Semomesia macaris  (Hewitson, 1859) 
Semomesia marisa Marisa eyemark  (Hewitson, 1858) 
Semomesia nesti  (Hewitson, 1858) 
Semomesia tenella Stichel, 1910

References

Riodinidae
Butterfly genera
Taxa named by John O. Westwood